Małgorzata Irena Foremniak (born 8 January 1967 in Radom) is a Polish actress. She is starring in the Polish TV series Na dobre i na złe as Zofia Stankiewicz-Burska and has played the role of Ash in Avalon. She took part in Taniec z gwiazdami on TVN. She is now a judge in the Polish edition of Got Talent, called Mam talent!.

External links 
 

1967 births
Living people
People from Radom
Polish television actresses